Chato may refer to:

 an aircraft Polikarpov I-15
 Chato, Ghana, a village in upper Ghana
 Chato, Peru, a town in Peru
 Chato, Tanzania, a town in northwestern Tanzania
 Chato District, a district in northwestern Tanzania
 Chato Volcano, a mountain in Costa Rica
 Cerro Chato, a town in Uruguay
 Chato (cat), a fictional cat created by Gary Soto

People
 Chato people, an indigenous people of the Gulf Coast of Alabama and Mississippi
 Chato (Apache) (1854—1934), a Chiricahua warrior
 Armando "Chato" Robles (b. 1978), a Mexican boxer
 José "Chato" Iraragorri (1912—1983), a Spanish footballer
 Liwayway Vinzons-Chato (b. 1945), a Filipino politician
 Osvaldo "Chato" Peredo (b. 1941), Bolivian physician and revolutionary
 Paul Chato (b. 1954), a Canadian comedian
 Raúl "Chato" Padilla (1917—1994), a Mexican actor
 Bill Tchato (1975), a Cameroonian footballer
 Siaka Bagayoko, aka "Chato" (b. July 4, 1998), Malian footballer who plays in the U-17 Malian national team
 Chato Santana, a fictional DC Comics character who shares the supervillain name El Diablo

See also
 Chato Murciano, a breed of pig from Murcia, Spain
 Chatos Islands, islands off Antarctica
 Chato's Land, a western film